North District is the northernmost district of the 18 districts of Hong Kong. It is located in the northeastern part of the New Territories. The new town of Fanling–Sheung Shui is within this district. It had a population of 298,657 in 2001. The district has the second lowest population density in Hong Kong.

It borders with Shenzhen city with the Sham Chun River. Most major access points to Mainland China from Hong Kong lie in this district.

Demographics
According to statistics, 70% of the district population lives in the public estates in the Fanling–Sheung Shui New Town. 40,000 villagers living around the two town centres and the main rural towns (Sha Tau Kok and Ta Kwu Ling) account for most residents in the district.

Islands of the district

 A Chau
 Ap Chau Mei Pak Tun Pai
 Ap Chau Pak Tun Pai
 Ap Chau (Robinson Island)
 Ap Lo Chun
 Ap Tan Pai
 Ap Tau Pai
 Chap Mo Chau
 Cheung Shek Tsui
 Fu Wong Chau
 Fun Chau
 Hung Pai
 Kat O Chau (Crooked Island)
 Ko Pai
 Kok Tai Pai
 Lan Shuen Pei
 Lo Chi Pai
 Ngo Mei Chau (Crescent Island)
 Pak Ka Chau
 Pak Sha Chau (Round Island)
 Pat Ka Chau
 Sai Ap Chau
 Sha Pai
 Shau Kei Pai
 Sheung Pai
 Shui Cham Tsui Pai
 Siu Nim Chau
 Ta Ho Pai
 Tai Nim Chau
 Tsing Chau (Table Island)
 Wong Nai Chau
 Wong Nai Chau
 Wong Wan Chau (Double Island)
 Wu Chau
 Wu Pai
 Wu Yeung Chau Pai
 Yan Chau
 Yeung Chau

Education

Miscellaneous
The northern end of the Wilson Trail hiking path is located in the North District. The trail ends at Nam Chung.

Transport 
North District is served by the East Rail line, Fanling Highway, San Tin Highway and Sha Tau Kok Road.

MTR Stations
 Fanling station
 Sheung Shui station
 Lo Wu station (terminus of East Rail line)

Border crossings
 Sha Tau Kok (road)
 Man Kam To (road)
 Lo Wu (train)

See also
 Fanling
 Frontier Closed Area
 Wo Hop Shek
 List of areas of Hong Kong
 North District FC

External links

 North District District Council
 List and map of electoral constituencies 1 (large PDF file)
 List and map of electoral constituencies 2 (large PDF file)
 Fanling-Sheung Shui New Town
 Satellite image of the new town of Fanling-Sheung Shui and its vicinity by Google Maps